Abladey Morgan (born September 13, 1980) is a Ghanaian football (soccer) player last playing at the position of midfielder for Accra Hearts of Oak SC.

Career
He began his career by Accra Hearts of Oak SC, he is also one of Accra Hearts of Oak's most experienced strikers. In 2005, he had an unsuccessful trial with Al Nasr club of Saudi Arabia.

International
In 2004 played his one and only game for the Ghana national football team. He was one of the 2004 golden generation of Accra hearts of oak under the late Sir Jones Atuquayfio who won the prestigious trophy in Kumasi after playing a 1–1 draw.

References

External links
 

1980 births
Living people
Ghanaian footballers
Liberty Professionals F.C. players
Ghana international footballers
Accra Hearts of Oak S.C. players
Association football midfielders